The 2017 Vietnamese National Football Third League will be the 13th season of the Vietnamese National Football Third League. The season will begin on 3 October 2017 and finish on 9 October 2017.

Rule 
In this season, there are 8 teams divided geographically to 2 groups with 4 teams per group. The winner and runner-up of each group will promote to Second League. The teams play each other once in a centralised venue.

Team changes 
The following teams have changed division since the 2016 season.

To Vietnamese Third League 
Relegated from Vietnamese Second League
 Vĩnh Long
Relegated from V.League 2
 Đồng Nai
New entry
 Công An Nhân Dân B
 Quảng Ngãi
 Kiên Giang
 Bà Rịa Vũng Tàu

From Vietnamese Third League 
Promoted to Vietnamese Second League
 Phù Đổng
 Kon Tum
Withdrew
 Hà Nội C

League table

Group A 
All matches played in Hà Nội.

Group B 
All matches played in Hồ Chí Minh City.

Matches

Matchday 1

Group A

Group B

Matchday 2

Group A

Group B

Matchday 3

Group A

Group B

See also  
 2017 V.League 1
 2017 V.League 2
 2017 Vietnamese National Football Second League

References 

2017 in Vietnamese football